Homsar (also Romanized as Homsār) is a village in Hombarat Rural District, in the Central District of Ardestan County, Isfahan Province, Iran. At the 2006 census, its population was 82, in 25 families.

References 

Populated places in Ardestan County